Lassi Olavi Ketola (born 16 January 1978) is a Finnish former professional tennis player.

Born in Kajaani, Ketola was a five-time winner at the national doubles championships and played collegiate tennis for the UCLA Bruins before turning professional.

Ketola made two doubles finals on the ATP Challenger Tour and was a Davis Cup representative for Finland in 2004, partnering Juho Paukku in a doubles rubber against Israel.

ITF Futures titles

Doubles: (2)

See also
List of Finland Davis Cup team representatives

References

External links
 
 
 

1978 births
Living people
Finnish male tennis players
UCLA Bruins men's tennis players
People from Kajaani
Sportspeople from Kainuu